The 1973 WANFL season was the 89th season of the Western Australian National Football League. It is most famous for Subiaco breaking the longest premiership drought in the history of the competition, winning for the first time since 1924 after having been a chopping block for most of the middle third of the century. Under the coaching of former  champion Ross Smith, the Lions, as they became christened in July, bounced back from two disappointing seasons to lose only two of their final sixteen home-and-away games for their first minor premiership since 1935, then in a low-scoring Grand Final comfortably defeated a much more hardened West Perth team.

In addition to Subiaco's premiership win, veteran goal machine Austin Robertson, Jr. broke Ted Tyson’s record for most goals in a WANFL career late in the home-and-away season.

The season also saw 1972 Grand Finalists Claremont suffer the worst single-season fall in WAFL history, from only three losses to only four wins despite being pre-season premiership favourites, as ’s century goalkicker Geoff Blethyn proved an inadequate trade for champion ruckman Graham Moss. Eight losses by under two goals sunk Claremont further. Despite exceptional form from Barry Cable in his last season with the club, Perth also fell from preliminary finalists to their worst record for thirty-two seasons of only six wins. Perennial battlers Swan Districts looked like a first finals berth since 1965 during the autumn but won only two of their last thirteen matches as a rainy winter negated the strength in marking that won Swans their early victories.

Home-and-away season

Round 1

Round 2

Round 3 (Easter weekend)

Round 4

Round 5

Round 6

Round 7

Round 8

Round 9

Round 10

Round 11

Round 12

Round 13

Round 14

Round 15

Round 16

Round 17

Round 18

Round 19

Round 20

Round 21

Ladder

Finals

First semi-final

Second semi-final

Preliminary final

Grand Final

Notes
The other two were by West Perth against Swan Districts in 1940 and the Cardinals against South Fremantle in 1966.

References

External links
Official WAFL website
Western Australian National Football League (WANFL), 1973

West Australian Football League seasons
WANFL